Frolov is a rural locality (a khutor) in Mikhaylovka Urban Okrug, Volgograd Oblast, Russia. The population was 67 as of 2010. There are 4 streets.

Geography 
Frolov is located 10 km north of Mikhaylovka. Sebrovo is the nearest rural locality.

References 

Rural localities in Mikhaylovka urban okrug